Madeline Levine is a practicing psychologist in Marin County, California.  She is the author of four books: Viewing Violence published in 1996, See No Evil: A Guide to Protecting Our Children from Media Violence published in 1998, The Price of Privilege: how parental pressure and material advantage are creating a generation of disconnected and unhappy kids published in 2006, and "Teach your Children Well" published in 2012.  The first two books represent an analysis of the negative effects of media violence on child development.  Her third book The Price of Privilege is a study of the psychological ailments plaguing teens from affluent families.  The Price of Privilege is based not only on her 25 years of experience in treating such teens within Marin County (an affluent community within the San Francisco Bay Area) but also on her consultations with colleagues around the United States—particularly research psychologist Suniya S. Luthar—as well as her review of the contemporary psychological research on the subject. "Teach Your Children Well" is marketed as "a toolbox for parents, providing information, relevant research and a series of exercises to help parents clarify a definition of success that is in line with their own values as well as their children’s interests and abilities."

See also 
 The Price of Privilege

External links 

21st-century American psychologists
American women psychologists
Living people
Year of birth missing (living people)
21st-century American women